Milo Sperber (20 March 1911 – 22 December 1992) was a British actor, director and writer, who was born in Poland.

Early life
Sperber was born in 1911 into a family of Polish Hasidic Jews who fled anti-Semitism during the Second World War. His older brother was activist, author and intellectual Manès Sperber. The younger Sperber trained as a lawyer in Vienna before joining Max Reinhardt's school; there he played roles in Six Characters in Search of an Author and A Midsummer Night's Dream, among other plays. Martin Esslin was a classmate during this time. While on the rise as an actor, in 1939 he fled Germany and the Nazis with his family, eventually landing in Britain as refugees.

Career
Early in the Second World War Sperber joined the Oxford Pilgrim Players; he gained experience directing the company on tour in Case 27 VC and spending a season in London even during the Blitz. He also was involved in producing anti-Nazi propaganda for the BBC before the end of the war. His later career included stints in cabaret, theatre and television; in the last capacity, he performed as shoe salesman Mr. Grossman in four episodes of Are You Being Served?. In 1990, at the age of 79, he appeared in Series 2, Episode 7 of Poirot, "The Kidnapped Prime Minister," as Mr. Fingler, Poirot's kvetching tailor.

His big-screen career included performances in minor roles in such films as Foreign Intrigue, The Spy Who Loved Me, Operation Crossbow, In Search of the Castaways and Billion Dollar Brain. He taught for some time at the Royal Academy of Dramatic Arts, and served as a scriptwriter for the BBC's German language service. Many of his students at RADA went on to succeed in the arts, including Glenda Jackson.

Sperber's last appearance in the West End was in a 1984 production of The Clandestine Marriage at the Albany Theatre; he spent his last years travelling Britain, giving readings from the works of his brother, writer Manès Sperber.

Sperber died on 22 December 1992, aged 81 in London, United Kingdom.

Filmography

References

Further reading

Are You Being Served? A Celebration of Twenty-Five Years.  Richard Webber with David Croft and Jeremy Lloyd. New York; Welcome Rain, 1998.

1911 births
1992 deaths
Jews who immigrated to the United Kingdom to escape Nazism
Polish emigrants to the United Kingdom
BBC people
Academics of RADA
English male stage actors
English male television actors
English male film actors
Jewish English male actors
English Ashkenazi Jews
20th-century English male actors